Lake Colac, a freshwater lake of the Western District Lakes, is located north of the Colac town centre in Victoria, Australia.

A yacht club and rowing club are located adjacent to the lake's shore. During the summer months, water skiers have access to the lake's facilities, and many birds may be found on the lake's surface and in the area. The foreshore has a playground, boat ramp and the Colac Botanical Gardens. In January 2009, the lake dried up after years of drought, and the first time in 173 years.

In April 2016 the lake dried up after several years of drought.

The Lake Colac bird sanctuary is nearby.

Gallery

References

External links

Lakes of Victoria (Australia)
Corangamite catchment
Rivers of Barwon South West (region)
Colac, Victoria